Wyman Woods Guin (pseudonym: Norman Menasco; March 1, 1915 – February 19, 1989) was an American pharmacologist and advertising executive best known for writing science fiction.

Born in Wanette, Oklahoma, he started publishing during 1950, and gained attention the next year with his novella "Beyond Bedlam" in Galaxy Science Fiction. He is known best as a short story writer and was associated strongly with Galaxy. He produced only one novel, The Standing Joy.

In 2013, Guin was named as recipient for the Cordwainer Smith Rediscovery Award at ReaderCon 24.

Bibliography
  "The Delegate from Guapanga". Galaxy, August 1964.
  "A Man of the Renaissance". Galaxy, December 1964.
 Living Way Out, 1967.
 The Standing Joy, 1969.
 Beyond Bedlam, 1973. (UK edition, Sphere Books, same stories as Living Way Out, with added story “The Evidence for Whooping Cranes”)

Sources
 Contemporary Authors Vol. 171 p. 149.

References
 The Encyclopedia of Science Fiction pp. 528–529.

External links
 
 

Fantastic Fiction listing

20th-century American novelists
American male novelists
American science fiction writers
1915 births
1989 deaths
Place of death missing
People from Pottawatomie County, Oklahoma
Novelists from Oklahoma
American male short story writers
20th-century American short story writers
20th-century American male writers